Paul Emile Biyaga  (born 24 July 1987 in Mbang) is a Cameroonian professional footballer, currently playing for Muktijoddha Sangsad KC in Bangladesh Premier League.

Honours
 Won the Algerian Ligue Professionnelle 1 once with ASO Chlef in 2011

External links
dzfoot 

1983 births
Living people
Cameroonian footballers
Cameroonian expatriate footballers
Cameroonian expatriate sportspeople in Algeria
Association football forwards
ASO Chlef players
Expatriate footballers in Algeria
NA Hussein Dey players
Algerian Ligue Professionnelle 1 players
Song Lam Nghe An FC players
V.League 1 players
Expatriate footballers in Egypt
Expatriate footballers in Vietnam
Cameroonian expatriate sportspeople in Egypt
Cameroonian expatriate sportspeople in Vietnam
Arambagh KS players